Phaeomoniella is a genus of hyphomycete fungi in the family Celotheliaceae. The genus was circumscribed by Pedro Crous and Walter Gams in 2000 to contain the type species,  P. chlamydospora, the causal agent of Petro grapevine decline, a disesase in the esca disease complex. Phaeomoniella is similar to Phaeoacremonium, differing in cultural characteristics, and in the morphology of the conidiophores and conidia.

The family Phaeomoniellaceae was proposed by Paul Kirk in 2015, using a reference to the description of the order Phaeomoniellales, circumscribed earlier that year. However, because Celothelium (type genus of Celotheliaceae, a family published in 2008) is also included in the circumscription of the Phaeomoniellaceae, the older family name takes precedence and consequently, Phaeomoniellaceae is an illegitimate name according to nomenclatural rules.

Species
 Phaeomoniella chlamydospora 
 Phaeomoniella pinifoliorum 

Several species once classified in this genus have since been assigned to other genera:
Phaeomoniella capensis , is now Paraphaeomoniella capensis
Phaeomoniella dura , is now Celerioriella dura
Phaeomoniella effusa , is now Aequabiliella effusa
Phaeomoniella niveniae , is now Neophaeomoniella niveniae
Phaeomoniella prunicola , is now Celerioriella prunicola
Phaeomoniella tardicola , is now Minutiella tardicola
Phaeomoniella zymoides , is now Neophaeomoniella zymoides

References

Eurotiomycetes
Eurotiomycetes genera
Taxa described in 2000